Carvell Wallace (born October 20, 1974 in McKeesport, PA) is a New York Times bestselling author, writer, and podcaster. He is a regular contributor to Pitchfork, MTV News, the Huffington Post, and Slate, and has written for The New York Times, New York Magazine, GQ, The Toast, The Guardian, The New Yorker, Esquire, Quartz, ESPN, and other publications. He is the creator and host of Finding Fred, an iHeart Media documentary podcast about the life of Fred Rogers; host of Closer Than They Appear, an Al Jazeera podcast about race and identity in America, and co-host of the Slate parenting podcast Mom & Dad Are Fighting. He is co-writer of the Slate parenting advice column, Care & Feeding. In 2019, he helped create the Sundance Institute exhibition Still Here, an immersive multimedia installation about mass incarceration, erasure, and gentrification in Harlem, New York.

Early life
Wallace was raised by a working-class single mother in McKeesport, Pennsylvania. He had "a very chaotic childhood" but "was really obsessed with media" from a young age, namely TV shows and movies. One of his early idols was Eddie Murphy.

Education
Wallace became interested in acting when he was in ninth grade. He graduated from Los Angeles County High School for the Arts and was admitted to New York University's Tisch School of Arts conservatory program. He graduated from the university with a Bachelor of Fine Arts in Experimental Theatre in 1997.

Career
Starting in 1997, Wallace spent 15 years working designing and running programs for incarcerated youth, foster youth, and at-risk youth in New York City and San Francisco. His work involved working with "young people in foster care, employment programs, [and] probation and detention." One of his projects involved designing an education intake and assessment model for youth released from Rikers Island and Spofford Detention Facility. Another project, undertaken in 2000, entailed the redesign and expansion of an organic farming employment program, under the auspices of the San Francisco League Of Urban Gardeners, for middle school-aged youth in the Bayview/Hunters Point neighborhood, during which time he taught on the subjects of sustainable farming, food security, and environmental justice. He was also tasked with creating a reentry to society program for youth from San Francisco County who were exiting long-term incarceration. Furthermore, he "wrote the curriculum for and ran the pilot for a career certificate training program for youth leaving foster care in San Francisco, Alameda, Contra Costa, and Solano counties." In 2003, he created and taught a course for middle school-aged black youth which combined history with behavior modification and social skills development. He subsequently spent seven years as at Revolution Prep in Santa Monica, California.

During this time, Wallace co-founded Flourish Agenda whose mission included outreach to "black youth in schools and community organizations to help overcome racial trauma and provide tools that are necessary for success." Also during this period, Wallace co-created the Vibosity app, which "allow[ed] kids to assess their own personal, social, and emotional growth," was a speaker at Alterconf San Francisco as well as the San Francisco Tech Inclusion Conference, and was named one of Echoing Green's Black Male Achievement Fellows.

Wallace's writings began to appear in outlets such as The Toast in 2016, for which he wrote the in-depth history piece "The Negro Motorist Green Book and Black America's Perpetual Search For A Home." The same year, he wrote a profile of NBA player Steph Curry, Wallace's first profile, which was published in The New Yorker. Starting in March 2016, he spent a year and six months as am MTV News Music Desk columnist, writing on subjects ranging from Prince, John Coltrane, white rappers, and Aaliyah, to Bernie Worrell, De La Soul, G-Eazy, and Meghan Trainor.

In 2017, Wallace wrote GQ cover story on Mahershala Ali. 
Among many writings of his that year, he teamed with Al Jazeera to start the Closer Than They Appear podcast, an exploration of race and identity in America. The podcast went on to win a Kaleidoscope Award from the Radio Television Digital News Association.

In 2018, Wallace wrote Viola Davis's Woman of the Year piece for Glamour. He also wrote Obama's Parting Gift, a story about the end of Barack Obama's presidency for The New Yorker, which earned a spot in 2018's Best American Essays. The same year, his Al Jazeera podcast, Closer Than They Appear, received a favorable review from the Los Angeles Review of Books.

On March 12, 2019, Esquire published Wallace's "Samuel L. Jackson Operates Like He Owns the Place. (He Does.)" as their cover story. Also in 2019, Wallace helped the Golden State Warriors' Andre Iguodala write the book The Sixth Man: A Memoir, which ranked as a New York Times bestseller. Wallace also created the iHeart Media podcast Finding Fred, a documentary podcast about the life of Fred Rogers, garnering accolades such as being named the #1 Podcast of 2019 by The Atlantic.

Awards and honors
 Finding Fred, Wallace's documentary podcast about the life of Fred Rogers, named #1 Podcast of 2019 by The Atlantic. 
Finding Fred, Wallace's documentary podcast about the life of Fred Rogers, was voted one of the Best of 2019 by CBC Podcasts, the podcast branch of the Canadian Broadcasting Corporation.
In June 2019, the Los Angeles Times placed The Sixth Man: A Memoir, the book Wallace helped the Golden State Warriors' Andre Iguodala write, on their list "7 buzzworthy June books to look out for."
Kaleidoscope Award, granted by the Radio Television Digital News Association (2018)
Echoing Green Black Male Achievement Fellow (2015)
2023 American Mosaic Journalism Prize

Personal life
Wallace struggled with drugs and alcohol in his 20s and 30s; alcoholism ran in his family.

Wallace has a son, born in 2002, and a daughter, born in 2006.

Podcasts

References

1974 births
American writers
American advice columnists
American male journalists
American podcasters
People from McKeesport, Pennsylvania
Living people
Tisch School of the Arts alumni